Shirur may refer to various places in India:

People
 Suma Shirur (born 1974), Indian shooting competitor

Places

Maharashtra
 Shirur, Maharashtra, a city in Pune district of Maharashtra
 Shirur taluka, a tehsil in Pune district of Maharashtra
 Shirur (Lok Sabha constituency), Maharashtra
 Shirur (Vidhan Sabha constituency), in the Maharashtra Legislative Assembly
 Shirur Kasar, a tehsil in Beed district of Maharashtra
 Shirur Tajband, a village in Latur district of Maharashtra

Karnataka
 33 Shiroor, a village in Udupi Taluk, Udupi district, Karnataka
 41 Shiroor, a village in Udupi Taluk, Udupi district, Karnataka
 Shiroor Math, one of the Ashta Mathas of Udupi in 41 Shiroor village
 Shiroor, a village in Kundapur Taluk, Udupi district, Karnataka
 Shiroor railway station
 Shirur, Belgaum, a village in Belgaum district, Karnataka
 Shirur, Dharwad, a village in Dharwad district, Karnataka
 Hodke Shiroor, a village in Honnavar Taluk, Uttara Kannada district, Karnataka

See also
 Shirur Anantpal, a town in Latur district, Maharashtra
 Shirur Anantpal Taluka, a taluka in Latur district, Maharashtra
 Shirur Kasar, a tehsil in Beed district, Maharashtra